Rachel O'Riordan (born 1974) is an Irish theatre director. She is currently the artistic director at the Lyric Hammersmith, London.

Early life and education
Born in Cork, Ireland to poet and novelist Robert Anthony Welch and Angela O'Riordan Welch, O'Riordan first trained as a ballet dancer. This culminated in a scholarship to the White Lodge, Royal Ballet School and then Mariinsky Ballet (formerly Kirov). She studied English and Theatre studies at Queen Mary, University of London, before completing her PhD entitled Shakespeare's Physical Text: The Body's Imperative at the University of Ulster in 2002.

Career 
From to 2002 to 2011, O'Riordan co-founded and ran the Ransom theatre company in Belfast, Northern Ireland, where she directed the production Hurricane. The show was performed at the Edinburgh Festival Fringe and earned a season in London's west-end and off-Broadway in New York City. O'Riordan then completed a season with the Peter Hall Company, where she directed August Strindberg's Miss Julie, and an adaption of George Orwell's Animal Farm at the Theatre Royal in Bath, England.

O'Riordan's tenure as artistic director of Ransom saw her commission and direct the first play by David Ireland, Arguments for Terrorism, and new plays Early Bird by Leo Butler and Transparency by Suzie Miller, Protestants by Robert Welch, and, the Irish famine-based This Piece of Earth by Richard Dormer. During this time she also ran a three-year programme entitled Writers on the Edge to develop new writing for women in Northern Ireland.

O'Riordan was artistic director at the Perth Theatre between 2011 and 2014. Her first production was Shakespeare's Twelfth Night. "Unfaithful" by Owen McCafferty was produced by the Traverse Theatre for the Edinburgh Fringe Festival in 2014. 

In October 2013, O'Riordan was announced as artistic director of the Sherman Theatre, and took up the post in February 2014. The most significant result of the time in Cardiff was the formation of the partnership with playwright Gary Owen. "Iphigenia in Splott" and "Killology" were both award-winners. 

In January 2016, she was named amongst the 100 most influential people in theatre in the UK by The Stage

In February 2019 O'Riordan joined the Lyric Hammersmith, London as artistic director, succeeding Sean Holmes. Her first production was a transposition by Tanika Gupta of "A Doll's House" to Victorian Kolkata.  

Productions in the return of theatre after the pandemic in 2022 were "Scandaltown" and a revival of "Iphigenia in Splott", again with Sophie Melville. It was the choice of critic Arifa Akbar in the Guardian for best production of the year.

Personal life 
O'Riordan is married to actor Richard Dormer.

Selected productions

References 

1974 births
Alumni of Queen Mary University of London
Alumni of Ulster University
Irish theatre directors
Living people
People educated at the Royal Ballet School